Olive Kitteridge is a 2008 novel by American author Elizabeth Strout. The novel provides a portrait of the title character and a number of recurring characters in the coastal town of Crosby, Maine. It takes the form of 13 short stories that are interrelated but discontinuous in terms of narrative.

It won the 2009 Pulitzer Prize for Fiction and was a finalist for the 2008 National Book Critics Circle Award. HBO produced a four-part miniseries based on the novel featuring Frances McDormand in the title role, which aired on November 2 and 3, 2014. The series won eight awards at the 2015 Primetime Emmys. A sequel to the novel, titled Olive, Again, was published on October 15, 2019 by Random House.

Stories

"Pharmacy"
The first story centres on Henry Kitteridge, the pharmacist of the town of Crosby and husband of Olive, and his relationship with an employee, Denise Thibodeau. Henry daydreams of taking care of Denise after the death of her husband, though he still loves his cantankerous wife Olive. Jerry McCarthy, the delivery boy, eventually proposes to Denise and the couple move to Texas. Denise maintains contact with Henry through a yearly birthday letter.

"Incoming Tide"
Kevin Coulson returns to Crosby where he grew up, planning to go to his childhood home and die by suicide. While sitting in his car he is approached by Olive Kitteridge, his former math teacher, who enters his car and speaks to him frankly about his mother's suicide years before and her own father's suicide. Kevin decides not to go through with his plan. Olive notices that a former classmate of Kevin's, Patty Howe, has fallen into the dock, and Kevin rescues her.

"The Piano Player"
Angie O'Meara, who plays piano at the Warehouse Bar and Grill, is an alcoholic who can only perform in front of people when she is drunk. One winter evening she sees her ex-boyfriend Simon in the audience and she calls her married lover, Malcolm, to break off their relationship. Simon later tells Angie that her mother, a prostitute, followed Simon and propositioned him. She thinks he is lying because of his dissatisfaction with his own life.

"A Little Burst"
Olive's only child, Christopher, finally marries at the age of 38. Olive finds the wedding overwhelming since she is very close to Chris. She overhears his new bride, Sue, making fun of the dress Olive is wearing, and implying that Olive is difficult. Infuriated, Olive steals and damages some of Sue's clothes, giving her a little burst of happiness of the kind Olive depends on to make her life worth living.

"Starving"
Harmon, who runs the local hardware store, begins an affair with the widow Daisy Foster after his wife, Bonnie, informs him she is no longer interested in sex. Harmon observes Tim Burnham and his girlfriend Nina and is intrigued by their loose attitudes towards drugs and sex. When Tim leaves Nina, she goes to Daisy for help and reveals she suffers from anorexia. Olive Kitteridge, Harmon and Daisy all try to help Nina, but she eventually suffers a relapse and dies. These events cause Harmon to realize he is in love with Daisy and he rents Tim and Nina's former home, in preparation for leaving Bonnie.

"A Different Road"
Olive reflects on an occasion when she stopped at a small hospital emergency room to use their bathroom. Despite not feeling ill, she was persuaded to have an examination. The delay meant that Olive and Henry were there when two young men invaded the hospital looking for drugs. Held hostage alongside the nurse and the doctor, Henry and Olive began quarreling, with Olive disparaging Henry's mother and Henry taking the nurse's side when Olive rebuked her for praying. After their rescue, tensions remain between the couple and Olive reflects how their relationship has been affected by their experiences at the hospital.

"Winter Concert"
Jane and Bob Houlton, a retired couple, meet the parents of their daughter's friends at a concert. Jane knows that one of their daughters has had an abortion. In conversation, the couple mention seeing Bob at an airport in Miami. At home, Jane confronts Bob, who admits that, four years earlier, his former mistress had contacted him because she had breast cancer. Jane is upset by his betrayal.

"Tulips"
Olive's son Chris and his new wife have moved to California. After a year, Chris announces that they are divorcing but he will be staying in California. Olive and Henry try to adjust to retired life, but Henry suffers a stroke which leaves him unresponsive, forcing him to move to a care home. Olive finds herself contemplating suicide now that she lives alone. After receiving a condolence note, Olive goes to visit Louise Larkin. Louise and her husband have become shut-ins after their son Doyle committed murder. Louise talks about suicide with Olive and mocks her for lying to make her life appear better than it is. Shortly after while visiting Henry, Olive gives him "permission" to die but he continues to live.

"Basket of Trips"
Olive helps set up the wake of Ed Bonney, something Henry would have done were he well. During the wake, Kerry Monroe, the cousin of Ed's widow Marlene, becomes intoxicated and makes a scene. Olive later finds Marlene with Kerry, who has passed out. Marlene confesses to Olive that, since Ed died, Kerry has confessed to having previously had an affair with him. She asks Olive to dispose of a basket filled with pamphlets for vacation packages which Marlene now feels unable to look at.

"Ship in a Bottle"
Winnie's sister Julie is left at the altar by her fiancé Bruce, who tells her he wants to continue dating, but does not want to get married. Julie's mother Anita threatens to kill Bruce and disown Julie if she continues her relationship with him after he left her at the altar. Nevertheless, Julie leaves on a bus to go to Bruce in Boston. Anita finds a note Julie wrote to Winnie asking her to stop her parents finding out and Winnie realizes that something between her and her mother is now broken.

"Security"
Chris has married a second time and is now living in New York City. He asks Olive to visit and she goes, realizing that Chris's invitation is only a way to get her to help out with his two young stepchildren. Olive dislikes Chris's new wife Ann, who smokes and drinks while pregnant, but does her best to help out. After an incident during a trip to get ice cream, Olive tells Chris she wants to leave and they quarrel. Olive leaves New York City and goes home early with neither her son nor daughter-in-law taking her to the airport.

"Criminal"
The penultimate story focuses on Rebecca Brown, the daughter of a minister, who starts to develop kleptomania after her father's death and fantasizes about burning things.

"River"
After Henry's death, Olive meets widower Jack Kennison, a retired professor, after she finds him having fainted on a walking path. Olive and Jack build up a friendship that blossoms into romance despite their different political beliefs. Olive begins a new relationship with him realizing she has found a reason to live again.

Characters
The Kitteridge Family
 Olive Kitteridge – an abrasive junior high school math teacher, later a volunteer for a variety of organizations including the American Red Cross and a museum in Portland, Maine.
 Henry Kitteridge – Olive's husband, Crosby's town pharmacist.
 Pauline Kitteridge – Henry's mother. She and Olive had a bad relationship.
 Ora – Olive's aunt.
 Christopher "Chris" Kitteridge – Olive and Henry's son, a podiatrist.
 Dr. Suzanne "Sue" Bernstein-Kitteridge – Chris's first wife, Jewish, from Philadelphia, Pennsylvania, persuades him to leave Crosby and move to California, they divorce soon thereafter.
 Ann Kitteridge – Chris's second wife, met in a support group for divorcees, encourages him to follow their therapist to New York City.
 Theodore – Ann's son by her first marriage.
 Annabelle – Ann's daughter, father never identified, apparently the result of a fling after her divorce.

The Thibodeau/McCarthy Family
 Denise Thibodeau – works at Henry Kitteridge's pharmacy, the not-so-secret object of his affection.
 Henry Thibodeau – Denise's first husband, a former football hero, works as a plumber, killed in a hunting accident by his best friend Tony Kuzio.
 Jerry McCarthy – overweight delivery boy at the pharmacy, eventually becomes Denise's second husband, they move to Texas.
 Paul McCarthy – Jerry and Denise's teenaged son, obese like his father.

Lounge Patrons and Employees
 Angela "Angie" O'Meara – alcoholic piano player.
 Malcolm Moody – Crosby's first selectman, having an extramarital affair with Angie.
 Joe – bartender.
 Betty – waitress.
 Walter Dalton – alcoholic regular, former college professor, Malcom Moody calls him a "fairy."
 Simon – Angie's former boyfriend, also a piano player, left her to become a real estate lawyer in Boston, Massachusetts.

The Foster Connections
 Daisy Foster – goes to church with Henry Kitteridge (whereas Olive will not).
 Copper Foster – Daisy's deceased husband, a policeman.
 Harmon – surname never given, owns hardware store, has an affair with Daisy.
 Bonnie – Harmon's wife, he eventually leaves her for Daisy.  They have 4 adult sons, but only two are named.
 Kevin – One of Harmon and Bonnie's sons, he keeps in closest contact with his parents.
 Derrick – Another of Harmon and Bonnie's sons, more aloof.
 Martha – Kevin's wife, a vegetarian.

The Burnham Connections
 Timothy "Tim" Burnham – sawmill worker, busted for growing marijuana.
 Nina White – Tim's girlfriend, suffers from anorexia, Daisy Foster, Harmon and Olive all try to help her, eventually dies in treatment.
 Victoria – Nina's friend who eventually steals Tim from her and worsens her eating disorder.
 Kathleen Burnham – Tim's aunt.

The Houlton Family
 Jane Houlton – school nurse at junior high school, works with Olive.
 Bob Houlton – Jane's husband, apparently has a former mistress in Miami, Florida.
 Becky Houlton – Jane and Bob's daughter.
 Tim Houlton – Jane and Bob's son.

The Granger Family
 Alan Granger – he and his wife are called "The Lydias" by the Houlton family, because their connection is through their daughter.
 Donna Granger – the other half of "The Lydias," has eye lift surgery that Jane Houlton finds disturbing.
 Lydia Granger – Alan and Donna's daughter, married a veterinarian who bit her.
 Patty Granger – another daughter of Alan and Donna.

The Larkin Family
 Roger Larkin – a banker.
 Louise Larkin – Roger's wife, a guidance counselor at Olive's school, undergoes shock therapy in Portland.
 Doyle Larkin – Roger and Louise's son, murders a woman by stabbing her repeatedly.
 Suzanne Larkin — Roger and Louse's daughter, now a lawyer living in Connecticut.

The Monroe-Bonney Family
 Marlene Monroe Bonney – Olive's former student, also mentioned as a customer at Harmon's hardware store.
 Ed Bonney – Marlene's high school sweetheart and eventual husband, owns a grocery, dies after a lengthy illness.
 Eddie Bonney – Marlene and Ed's son, serves in the United States Coast Guard.
 Lee Ann Bonney – Marlene and Ed's daughter, studying to become a nurse.
 Cheryl Bonney – Marlene and Ed's younger daughter.
 Kerry Monroe – Marlene's cousin, gets in trouble with the law, briefly tries to seduce Chris Kitteridge, an alcoholic, gets a job at the Bonney grocery, seduces Ed (which she reveals at his funeral before passing out).

The Harwood Family
 Anita Harwood – cashier at hospital coffee shop, former "Miss Potato Queen".
 Jim/Jimmy Harwood – Anita's husband, school janitor, recovering alcoholic.
 Winnifred "Winnie" Harwood – Anita and Jim's daughter.
 Julie – Anita's daughter by her first marriage, one of Olive's former students.
 Kyle – Winnie's uncle, evidently Anita's brother, supplies the family with tranquilizers.
 Ted – Anita's first husband, Julie's father, a carpenter.
 Bruce – Julie's fiancé who jilts her on their wedding day, a vacationer from Boston who rented a cottage with his brothers.

The Brown-Caskey Family
 Rebecca Brown – one of Olive's former students, a kleptomaniac who can't get a job.
 David – Rebecca's live-in boyfriend.
 Rev. Carleton Brown – Rebecca's father.
 Charlotte Caskey Brown – Rebecca's mother, abandons her family, moves to Tarzana, California where she becomes a follower of Scientology.
 Katherine Caskey – Rebecca's aunt.
 Rev. Tyler Caskey – Rebecca's grandfather, a Congregational minister.

Townfolk
 Bob Beane – encountered Angie O'Meara's ex-boyfriend Simon in Boston.
 Andrea Bibber – one of Olive's former students, a Social Worker
 Cynthia Bibber – Andrea's mother, suggests Olive and Henry are depressed after hospital incident.
 Mary Blackwell – indiscreet nurse who revealed Louise Larkin had undergone shock treatments at the hospital where she used to work in Portland, later takes a job at a local nursing home.
 Susan Bradford – attends Ed Bonney's funeral.
 Emily Buck – postal clerk.
 Cindy – Henry Kitteridge's nurse at the assisted living facility after he has a stroke.
 Molly Collins – home economics teacher, she and Olive help Marlene Bonney host a reception after her husband's funeral.
 Candy Connelly – Harmon's fourth grade crush.
 Harry Coombs – died of lymphoma.
 Dr. Kevin Coulson – returns from New York to commit suicide, impulse interrupted by a visit with Olive and a near drowning.
 Bessie Davis – old maid, frequent customer at Harmon's hardware store, lonely, talks too much.
 Mrs. Granger – cantankerous employee at Henry Kitteridge's pharmacy, dies in her sleep, replaced by Denise Thibodeau.
 Matt Grearson – attends Ed Bonney's funeral.
 Cecil Green – "slow", he brings coffee and donuts to the reporters who hover around the Larkin home after Doyle murders a woman.
 Patty Crane Howe – waitress at the marina, recently miscarried, almost drowns but is rescued by Kevin Coulson and Olive.
 Rachel Jones – gets Valium from Henry Kitteridge after her husband leaves her.
 Jack Kennison – stuffy Harvard graduate, retired in Crosby with wife, they have one daughter (unnamed) who is a lesbian and lives in California, he and Olive begin dating after they are both widowed, she is shocked to discover he is a Republican.
 Mrs. Kettleworth – Daisy Foster stole a pear from her front yard when she was a child.
 Tony Kuzio – Henry Thibodeau's lifelong friend, kills him in a hunting accident.
 Miss Lampley – Chris Kitteridge's first grade teacher.
 Beth Marden – operates a nursery school, Julie's former employer.
 Donny Madden – attends Ed Bonney's funeral.
 Greg Marston – buys ball bearings at Harmon's hardware store.
 Mrs. Merriman – gets her blood pressure medicine at Henry Kitteridge's pharmacy.
 Cliff Mott – suffering from heart disease but still shovels snow.
 Bill Newton – friend of Henry and Olive Kitteridge.
 Bunny Newton – Bill's wife, Olive's confidant.
 Karen Newton – Bill and Bunny's daughter, cheats on her husband Eddie.
 Jim O'Casey – taught at junior high school with Olive, he picked her and Chris up every morning to drive them to school, spoke of leaving their spouses and running away together but he died in an automobile accident, perhaps while drunk, before acting on this impulse.
 Wayne Roote – suffers from dementia.
 Betty Simms – close neighbor of Olive and Henry, had five children.
 Mrs. Tibbets – gets erythromycin prescription filled at Henry Kitteridge's pharmacy.
 Les Washburn – landlord, rents a house first to Tim Burnham and Nina White, but evicts them after a pot bust, later rents the same house to Daisy Foster and Harmon.

Notes

External links

2008 short story collections
American short story collections
Pulitzer Prize for Fiction-winning works
Random House books
English-language books
Novels set in Maine
Novels by Elizabeth Strout